America ReFramed  is a weekly independent documentary series broadcast on World Channel. Since 2012, America ReFramed has broadcast over 120 films by independent filmmakers. The series is co-produced by American Documentary, Inc. and the WORLD Channel. America ReFramed films feature personal stories that have a strong social-issue focus.

America ReFramed broadcasts have won several awards including a Peabody Award and Alfred I. duPont-Columbia University Award for broadcast journalism. The series has earned several Christopher, GRACIE, Telly and Cine Golden Eagle Awards, as well as nominations for EMMY, Independent Documentary Association, and Imagen awards.

America ReFramed Episodes

Notes

External links 
 Official America ReFramed site on WorldChannel.org
 Official America ReFramed video download site on PBS
 American Documentary, Inc. (series production company)

2012 American television series debuts
2010s American documentary television series
2020s American documentary television series